Shailesh Shrestha is a composer and musician of Nepalese films. Shailesh initially started out as a jingle composer, composing for non-film albums. He debuted as a film composer in the "Aawaran" and was noted for his highly acclaimed work in Nepalese Dreams and Gajalu which earned him several awards, including the Kamana Film Awards Award, Dcine Awards and the National Box Office Film Award in 2016 and 2017 respectively.

Profession

In his younger days, he was quite influenced by urban music. He started composing his songs as a rapper in 2006 and started earning his popularity among the Nepalese hip hop community (Nephop), and he was known by his stage name SPADIX. In 2008 he founded a crew called 'Infernal Blaze' and he slowly started producing for his own crew. By the end of 2009, his music was popular among the local hip hop artist and he made music for them. Later in 2010, his music was appreciated by the famous Nepalese commercial artist and he started producing GXSOUL, NEPSYDAZ, COD, Nima Rumba, Indira Joshi, Shreeya Shotang, Asif Shah, Ankit Dhakal, Mingma Sherpa, Girish Khatiwada, B-8EIGHT, Visan Yonjan, Yama Buddha, Priyanka Karki, Subani Moktan, Nattu, Samriddhi Rai, Marcia Adhikari. Almost after two years, he started his own recording studio RANGE STUDIO.

Shailesh got his first breather when director Subash Koirala approached him to compose the score for his film "AAWARAN". He later made a name for himself with this and eventually Hemraj BC followed his work and approached him to compile a "jerry" score. Anmol KC And Anna Sharma . which was later the greatest success in Nepali Film history.

Filmography, awards & nominations

References 

1989 births
Nepalese hip hop singers
Male film score composers
Living people
Nepalese film score composers